The National Missionary Baptist Convention of America (NMBCA) is an African-American Baptist convention.

History
The National Missionary Baptist Convention of America (NMBCA) was formed during a meeting attended by Dr. S. J. Gilbert, Sr. and Dr. S. M. Wright, along with several leaders and members from the National Baptist Convention of America, Inc. and took place on November 14–15, 1988 at the People's Missionary Baptist Church, Incorporated in Dallas, Texas.

The meeting concerned the differences of opinion on the relationship between the National Baptist Convention of America, Inc. and the National Baptist Publishing Board (now known as the R.H. Boyd Publishing Corporation), the National Baptist Sunday School, and the Baptist Training Union Congress.  The new body gained the support of existing state conventions in California, Texas, Arizona, Oklahoma, and Indiana, and has formed others.

The Rev. S.M. Lockridge of San Diego was elected as the first president of the newly formed convention and served until his retirement in 1994. After Dr. Lockridge's retirement, elections have been held, and these men are the following Presidents. 
Dr. S.M. Wright, Dr. W.T. Snead Sr., Dr. Melvin V. Wade, Dr. C.C. Robertson, Dr. Nehemiah Davis, Dr. Anthony E. Sharp I (2018-present)

A party led by Dr. H. J. Johnson of Dallas, Texas withdrew and formed the Institutional Missionary Baptist Conference of America in 1998/1999.  This followed Dr. Johnson's unsuccessful campaign for the presidency, which was won by Dr. W.T. Snead, Sr.

Convention boards and auxiliaries
The convention consists of four boards (education, evangelical, home mission, foreign mission) and 10 auxiliaries (Ministers, Ministers' Wives & Widows, Brotherhood, Brotherhood II, Women's Missionary Union, Women's Missionary Union #2, Junior Women, Ushers, and Nurses Corp).  In addition the Convention has a Benevolence Board and Praise Team.

Convention meetings
The Convention meets three times a year - a Winter Board Meeting, generally held the week after the fourth Sunday in February; the Summer Board Meeting, a one-day session held during the week of the National Baptist Sunday Church School and Baptist Training Union Congress, sponsored by the R.H. Boyd Publishing Corporation of Nashville, TN, and in September.  The September five-day meeting is considered the Annual Session, held the week after the first Sunday.

Current leadership
The headquarter of the Convention is generally considered to travel with the President.  The convention was led by Dr. Nehemiah Davis from his election in September 2013 until his death on March 1, 2017. Davis had been the pastor of the Mount Pisgah Missionary Baptist Church of Fort Worth, TX. Presidents are selected every four years. 

In September 2018 Dr. Anthony E. Sharp, I., pastor of the Tabernacle of Praise Missionary Baptist Church of Dallas, was elected as the 7th President of the Convention.

References

Sources
Baptists Around the World, by Albert W. Wardin, Jr.
Handbook of Denominations, 11th Edition, by Frank S. Mead, Samuel S. Hill, & Craig D. Atwood

External links
National Missionary Baptist Convention of America - official Web Site

Historically African-American Christian denominations
Christian organizations established in 1988
Baptist denominations in the United States
Baptist denominations established in the 20th century
Members of the National Council of Churches